7065 is high zinc containing aluminum alloy. It is used for making plate.

Chemical Composition

Properties

Application 

 Plate
 Aerospace
 The combination of high strength and fracture toughness properties and corrosion resistance makes 7065 suitable as a replacement for 7010, 7050, 7075, 7475 and other alloys for critical intermediate thickness applications.
 Spar, rib, and integrally machined structural parts for new, derivative, or retrofit aircraft.

References

Aluminum alloy table 

Aluminium–zinc alloys